Draumir is a Norwegian band playing a form of dark and melodic rock music, eschewing digital technologies both among instruments and recording techniques. Musical references may be The Walkabouts, Tindersticks, and fellow Norwegians Midnight Choir. Some elements of Eastern European folk music also occur. The material is melodic, classic pop music.

The word draumir does not exist in any official language, but it bears resemblance to the Icelandic draumur, meaning dreams.

Members

 Jo Inge Johansen Frøytlog - Vocal, keys, guitar
 Alfred Cornelius Reines Hals - Violin, viola, vocal
 Håvard Stokstad - Bass guitar, vocal
 Alexandra Bråten - Vocal, organ, moog synthesizer, scissors, melodica.

History
The core of the band is songwriter Frøytlog, who has been involved with music since growing up in Flekkefjord on the southern coast of Norway. Since then, he has gradually changed the line-up, while also moving twice, to Bergen in 2000 and to Oslo in 2002. The band has changed names three times, most recently in 2004 from “Mir” into today's “Draumir”.

In Oslo, the band, still called Mir, was admitted into Jahn Teigen’s project for talent development, where they held numerous smaller concerts. After this, they started working with Chris Eckman (known from The Walkabouts, and long-time producer of Midnight Choir), which in late 2004 led to the band recording in Eckman's Ljubljana, Slovenia studio, where he also was the producer. The EP and the debut album are both mainly results of this work.

In 2006, Draumir was nominated in the Norwegian music awards Spellemannprisen as the debut of the year, without winning. In February of that year, Draumir played at the by:Larm-festival in Tromsø. Again the band was well-received, and the concert led to a record contract with Universal Music Norway. During the following months Draumir's second album, The Island, was composed, and then recorded in September/October 2006. It was released on March 26, 2007.

Alexandra Bråten left Draumir in 2007, and the band changed their name to Marbletown.

Discography

 Frozen Moments/Seeking My Distance, 2005 (EP)
 Draumir, 2005 (album)
 The Island, 2007 (album)

References

External links
 Official website

Norwegian musical groups